An all request television or radio show is a show that plays only listener or viewer requests.

The introduction to The Carpenters' version of Calling Occupants of Interplanetary Craft features a fictional dialogue between the disc jockey of an all request program on "All Hit Radio" and a listener that the DJ thinks is "Mike Ledgerwood", but is in fact an alien race.  The DJ comments that the request "We are observing your Earth" is "not on our play list".  This refers to an actual practice of all request programs of having a pre-set play list, and excluding any requests for items that are not on it.

Examples 
Some widely known all request shows include:
 All Request — an hour-long block of programming in which the staff at VH1 Classic play video requests that they receive via electronic mail

See also 
 All Request Live
 Total Request Live

External links 
 the list of requests of WXBA
 Power 91 DJ Guide, which gives advice to DJs on how to handle listener request and which actually advocates against the all request programme format
 KVRD Mark in the Morning, which points listeners making requests to the:
 KVRD Song & Artist Playlist

Radio programs
Television terminology